Sadasivanagar is a village and a Mandal in Nizamabad district in the state of Telangana in India.

Every year, celebrates Sri kashi Vishweshwara Swamy Kalyanam, Shiva rathri, Sri Krishna ashtami, Hanuman Jayanthi and Datta Jayanthi.

Geography
Which is located between Kamareddy and Nizamabad.
Sadashivanagar is located at Coordinates:. It is 120 km from the state capital of Hyderabad, 12 km from district headquarter Kamareddy. However, Sadashivanagar comes under the Zahirabad parliamentary constituency.

It has fort (locally called as GADI) in the center of the village. This fort was built by kameneni dynasty (called as Doralu)

Language
Major languages spoken in this area are Telugu, Hindi, Urdu and English. Telugu is the native language for most residents.

Occupation
The main occupation for many people is in agriculture. Sugarcane, paddy, soya, and corn are the primary crops.

References 

Villages in Nizamabad district